Roberto Breda (born 21 October 1969) is an Italian football coach and former player. He is the manager of Serie B club Ascoli.

Playing career
A midfielder, Breda made his Serie A debut with Sampdoria and later played with several other teams ranging from the top flight to Serie C clubs, most notably spending two long stints at Salernitana, being also a key member of the team who played a Serie A season during his first period at the club.

Coaching career
Breda served as head youth coach for the Reggina Primavera from 2007 to 2010, Breda was promoted as head coach of Reggina on 8 February 2010 after the dismissal of Ivo Iaconi. Breda's first game as head coach of Reggina was on home turf against Mantova (3–1) on 13 February. He guided the team to safety after a troublesome start of season, but was not confirmed as head coach and left Reggina in June 2010.

Later in July 2010 he was appointed as new boss of his former club Salernitana. He guided his club to third place in the regular season, then losing the promotion playoff finals to Verona in a 2–1 aggregate win for the Venetians.
 
He then left Salernitana at the end of the 2010–11 season in order to return at Reggina, replacing Gianluca Atzori at the helm of the Calabrians for the club's 2011–12 Serie B campaign. On 8 January 2012
he was stripped from his managerial duties allegedly due to poor results, but he was reinstantiated only on 15 April, three months later in place for Angelo Gregucci until the end of the season.

In the summer 2012 he was appointed head coach of Vicenza for the team's Serie B campaign, only to be sacked later in January 2013 due to poor results. He returned into management in September 2013, succeeding to Gaetano Auteri at newly promoted Serie B outsiders Latina and guiding them to a surprise league run that led the club to end the season in third place, only to be defeated by Cesena in the Serie A promotion playoff finals. After missing on top flight promotion, Breda decided to leave Latina, only to return at the helm of the club later in October 2014 in place for Mario Beretta. However, his second stint at Latina turned out to be largely unsuccessful and ended with him being dismissed on 5 January 2015, leaving the club in 21st place.

On 7 November 2018 he was named new head coach of last-placed Serie B club Livorno. On 9 December 2019, he was dismissed by Livorno following a string of poor results, including 7 losses in previous 10 games and 1 point in previous 4 games. On 3 February 2020, he was reappointed as head coach of Livorno. He was however sacked for a second time only one month later, on 8 March 2020.

On 29 November 2020, he was hired by Serie B club Pescara. He was sacked on 14 February 2021 after a 0–2 home loss to Venezia that left Pescara bottom of the league.

Breda returned into management on 6 February 2023 as the new head coach of Serie B side Ascoli, taking over from Cristian Bucchi.

Managerial statistics

Honours
Sampdoria:
 Coppa Italia: 1987–88, 1988–89
 UEFA Cup Winners' Cup: 1989–90

Parma
 Supercoppa Italiana: 1999

Salernitana
 Serie B: 1997–98

References

External links
Roberto Breda profile (football.it) 

1969 births
Living people
Sportspeople from Treviso
Association football midfielders
Italian footballers
Italy under-21 international footballers
Serie A players
Serie B players
Serie C players
U.S. Salernitana 1919 players
U.C. Sampdoria players
A.C.R. Messina players
Udinese Calcio players
Parma Calcio 1913 players
S.P.A.L. players
Genoa C.F.C. players
Catania S.S.D. players
Italian football managers
Reggina 1914 managers
U.S. Salernitana 1919 managers
L.R. Vicenza managers
A.C. Perugia Calcio managers
U.S. Livorno 1915 managers
Delfino Pescara 1936 managers
Ascoli Calcio 1898 F.C. managers
Serie B managers
Serie C managers
Footballers from Veneto